Le Centre Sheraton Hotel is a skyscraper hotel in Montreal, Quebec, Canada. It is located at 1201 René Lévesque Boulevard West in downtown Montreal, between Stanley Street and Drummond Street.

It was built by Arcop and was completed in 1982.

History

The hotel was planned to open in time for the 1976 Olympics as the world's largest Holiday Inn. However, the project suffered from cost overruns to the tune of $81 million. Construction took eight years and a different hotel chain opened the building. The mayor of Montreal officially opened the building in May 1982.

Baseball Hall of Fame member Don Drysdale died in room 2518 on July 3, 1993.  It hosted a meeting of G-20 finance ministers and central bank governors on October 24–25, 2000. It also hosted Wikimania 2017, attended by Civil Rights Movement historian Randy Kryn and 914 others.

References

External links

 

1982 establishments in Quebec
Downtown Montreal
Hotel buildings completed in 1982
Hotels established in 1982
Centre Sheraton
Sheraton hotels
Skyscraper hotels in Canada
Skyscrapers in Montreal